Falk Lykke (2 January 1583 – 7 July 1650) was a Danish nobleman, fief-holder, Colonel of the Scanian Regiment, and Knight of the Elephant. 

Lykke participated in the Kalmar War as captain in Gert Rantzau's regiment of foot, receiving Christianopel as a fief after the war. This he in 1625 exchanged for Visborg which meant he was in-charge of the whole island of Gotland; in its turn exchanged for St. Peter's Priory in Lund two years later. Lykke was a representative of the nobility of Skåne at several Diets. After the death of Anders Sincklar in 1625, Lykke became colonel of the Scanian Regiment. During the Torstenson War he and his regiment were stationed in Elsinore; a period characterized by severe conflicts between him and the local citizenry. After that war, Lykke resigned from his colonelcy, but was rewarded with a knighthood. 

Lykke was married to Kristine Rantzau. He held Skovgård in Jutland, and Bollerup, Kronovall and Gersnæs in Skåne, in allodial possession.

References

1583 births
1650 deaths
16th-century Danish people
17th-century Danish people
17th-century Danish military personnel
17th-century Danish nobility
Falk